Ossama Boughanmi (born on January 5, 1990) is a Tunisian football midfielder who plays for El-Ittihad.

References

External links
 

1990 births
Living people
Tunisian footballers
Tunisian expatriate footballers
Association football midfielders
Espérance Sportive de Tunis players